Henry Brock was an American college football player and coach. He played at Pittsburg State University in Pittsburg, Kansas from 1927 to 1930. Then went on to coach in the beginning of the 1940s.

Coaching career

College of Emporia
Brock was head football coach at the College of Emporia in Emporia, Kansas for the 1941 season.

Southwestern
After one season at College of Emporia, Brock became the 10th football coach at the Southwestern College in Winfield, Kansas, serving one season, in 1942 season, and compiling a record of 4–3–2.

Brock was also the basketball coach at Southwestern for the 1945–46 season, producing a record of 11–9.

Head coaching record

Football

References

Year of birth missing
Year of death missing
College of Emporia Fighting Presbies football coaches
Pittsburg State Gorillas football players
Southwestern Moundbuilders football coaches
Southwestern Moundbuilders men's basketball coaches
People from Emporia, Kansas